This is a list of Al Wasl SC football transfers for the 2008-09 season.

Transfers to Al Wasl

Transfers from AlWasl

Other Seasons
 2009–10 Al Wasl SC season
 2010–11 Al Wasl SC season

Notes and references

Al Wasl
2009